"Buy U a Drank (Shawty Snappin')" is a song by American rapper T-Pain featuring fellow American rapper Yung Joc. Produced by T-Pain himself, It was released on February 20, 2007 as the lead single from his second studio album, Epiphany.

Background
T-Pain describes the meaning of the song as "...these days lots of people begin their relationships in the clubs. Whole conversations begin with some guy buying a young lady a drink. I wanted to make a song for those folks."

References to other songs
The song is noted for having many references to other popular dance/rap songs:

Lil Scrappy's song "Money in the Bank" is referenced in the chorus with the line, "I got money in the bank / Shawty what you think about that".
Towards the middle you can hear the line "You don't know me" referring to T.I.'s "U Don't Know Me".
The line "We in the bed like 'Ooh'" is a reworked version of the chorus to the Lil Boosie song "Zoom".
At the beginning, the line, "Snap yo fingers, do your step, you can do it all by yourself", is a lead line from the Lil Jon song, "Snap Yo Fingers".
Also he states "back to the crib, show you how I live" refers to 50 Cent's "Just a Lil Bit".
At the end of the second verse, T-Pain says 'On That Patrón You Should Get Like Me', referencing Yung Joc's "It's Goin' Down" off his album New Joc City.
Later on in the song, T-Pain takes a line from the single by Unk, "Walk It Out" when he says, "...Walk it out."  The song also includes uncredited vocals by T-Pain's Nappy Boy artists, Tay Dizm and Jay Lyriq.  Jay Lyriq sings: "Let's get gone, walk it out....Now rock, rock, rock, rock, you can do it all by yourself", and Tay Dizm sings: "Now walk it out, think about it... Ah snap!". The song ranks 63rd on Rolling Stones list of the 100 Best Songs of 2007.

Chart performance
The song debuted on the Billboard Hot 100 at number 84 on the issue date of March 10, 2007. On the issue date of May 12, 2007 the single became T-Pain's first and Yung Joc's second number 1 single on Billboard's Hot R&B/Hip-Hop Songs chart. On the same Billboard magazine issue date, "Buy U a Drank (Shawty Snappin')" became T-Pain's highest charting single on the Billboard Hot 100 to date, surpassing the number 5 peak of "I'm 'n Luv (Wit a Stripper)". On the issue date of May 26, 2007, "Buy U a Drank (Shawty Snappin')" reached number 1, becoming T-Pain as well as Yung Joc's first number 1 single on the Billboard Hot 100. The song was less popular in the United Kingdom, failing to appear on the official UK Singles Chart.

The song, which spent its chart run in each of the top 12 positions of the Hot 100, broke the record of "Truly Madly Deeply" by Savage Garden, which previously had been the only single in the history of the Hot 100 to spend time in each of the top 10 positions on the chart during its run.

Music video
The music video was directed by Benny Boom.  It premiered on April 9, 2007 on MTV and features cameos from various artists such as E-40, Gorilla Zoe, Huey, Tay Dizm, Ryan Shaw, Shawnna, Jay Lyriq, Kardinal Offishall, Brandon T. Jackson and many others.

Charts

Weekly charts

Year-end charts

Decade-end charts

Certifications

Remixes

The official remix on the single features rapper Kanye West and the part 2 of the remix has UGK with T-Pain & West. There are also other remixes that features Chingy, Trey Songz, Stat Quo and T.I. respectively. There is also a remix with T-Pain, West, UGK & Trey Songz. Miami rapper, Lil' Brianna, sampled this record for a freestyle from her 2007 mixtape Princess of Miami. 

A remixed version titled I Like Dat was released on May 14 2021. It features T-Pain himself along with American singer Kehlani.

See also
List of Hot 100 number-one singles of 2007 (U.S.)
List of number-one R&B singles of 2007 (U.S.)

References

2007 singles
T-Pain songs
Yung Joc songs
Snap songs
Billboard Hot 100 number-one singles
Music videos directed by Benny Boom
Song recordings produced by T-Pain
Songs written by T-Pain
Songs about alcohol
2006 songs
Konvict Muzik singles
Songs about dancing